Spring Garden School District 178 or Spring Garden Grade School is a school district in Illinois. It operates Spring Garden Elementary School with a Mount Vernon postal address and outside of the city), and Spring Garden Middle School in Ina.

References

External links
 
Education in Jefferson County, Illinois
School districts in Illinois